Saatchi may refer to:

Saatchi (name), a Turkish surname (includes a list of people with the name)
Saatchi Gallery, contemporary art gallery
Saatchi & Saatchi, advertising agency 
M&C Saatchi, advertising agency
Saatchi (film), a 1983 Tamil film directed by S. A. Chandrasekhar